Steve Dooler is a former professional rugby league footballer who played in the 1990s and 2000s.

Playing career
Dooler made his début for Featherstone Rovers on Friday 10 April 1998.

Testimonial match
Dooler's benefit season at Featherstone Rovers took place during the 2006 season.

References

External links
Statistics at rugbyleagueproject.org
Jamie Stokes
Testimonials and Benefit Seasons.
Peter Roe June 1999 to August 2001.
Steve Sims April 1997 to September 1998.
Featherstone Rovers Families ...
June 2013
Rugby League: Back o' t' Wall by ...
June 2012
April 2012

Living people
English rugby league players
Featherstone Rovers players
Hunslet R.L.F.C. players
Place of birth missing (living people)
Rugby league centres
Rugby league five-eighths
Rugby league locks
Rugby league second-rows
Year of birth missing (living people)